Jean Grancolas was a theologian, liturgist and doctor of the Sorbonne.

References

French Roman Catholic priests